Bagata may refer to:
 Bagata people, one of the Scheduled Tribes of India living primarily in Andhra Pradesh
 Bagata, Bandundu, a town in Bandundu Province, Democratic Republic of the Congo
 Bagata Territory, a territory in Bandundu Province, Democratic Republic of the Congo
 Bagata (South Ossetia), a settlement in the Tskhinvali district of South Ossetia